This is a list of Billboard magazine's top popular songs of 1947 according to retail sales.

See also
1947 in music
List of number-one singles of 1947 (U.S.)

References

1947 record charts
Billboard charts